Highway 783 is a provincial highway in the Canadian province of Saskatchewan. It runs from Highway 11/Highway 212 near Duck Lake to Highway 40 at Marcelin. It crosses the North Saskatchewan River on the Wingard Ferry.

See also 
Roads in Saskatchewan
Transportation in Saskatchewan

References 

783